Theofanis Sotiris (born February 23, 1993) is a Greek footballer.

Career 
Sotiris played in the Gamma Ethniki in 2012 with Doxa Kranoula F.C, where he appeared in six matches. In 2017, he played in the Canadian Soccer League with York Region Shooters. He recorded his first two goals for the club on July 2, 2017 against Royal Toronto FC.

References 

Living people
1993 births
Greek footballers
Greek expatriate footballers
Doxa Kranoula F.C. players
York Region Shooters players
Canadian Soccer League (1998–present) players
Association football midfielders